The Hazara people are an ethnic group who inhabit and originate from Hazarajat (Hazaristan) region, located in central parts of Afghanistan and generally scattered throughout Afghanistan. However, there are significant populations of Hazaras in Pakistan and Iran, notably in Quetta, Pakistan and in Mashhad, Iran. Furthermore, many Afghan refugees are fleeing the conflict in Afghanistan who have in recent years settled in Iran and further bolstered the Hazara community in Pakistan.

Some overarching Hazara tribes are Sheikh Ali, Jaghori, Muhammad Khwaja, Jaghatu, Qara Baghi, Ghaznichi, Behsudi, Dai Mirdad, Turkmani, Uruzgani, Dai Kundi, Dai Zangi, Dai Chopan, Dai Zinyat, Qarlugh, Aimaq Hazara, and others.

Hazara tribes

See also 
 List of Hazara people

Notes

External links 
 Hazara tribal structure, Program for Culture and Conflict Studies, US Naval Postgraduate School

Tribes